Norbury is an area of south London. It shares the postcode London SW16 with neighbouring Streatham.

Etymology

The name Norbury derives from North Burh, (North Borough). Some local histories note that this was due to Norbury's position on the northern boundary of the former Manor of Croydon. Others state that it takes its name from a split in the borough of Bensham, one of the former seven boroughs of Croydon. "Northbenchesham" became the Northborough, then Norbury; "Southbenchesham" later became Thornton Heath.

History
For most of its history Norbury was rural countryside through which the London to Brighton Way Roman road passed. At Hepworth Road, the intact road, 32 feet wide, was excavated in 1961. Remnants of a metalled ford across the stream were found further south at Hermitage Bridge on the River Graveney which forms part of the boundary between Norbury and Streatham, before flowing on to the River Wandle, then the River Thames.

Norbury Manor
By the early thirteenth century, Norbury was a sub-manor within the chief manor of Croydon. The first recorded mention of Norbury Manor was in 1229 when Peter de Bendings conveyed the Manor to John de Kemsing and his wife Idonea and is referred to as the "lands stretching out either side of the London Road". In 1269 the Manor comprised 91 acres of arable land in Pollards Hill, 30 acres in Grandon, 55 acres of pasture, 36 acres of heathland, 2 acres of woodland and 17 acres of meadow land. In 1337, Norbury Manor was granted to Nicolas de Carew, who also held neighbouring Beddington Manor. The Carew family remained Lords of the Manor of Norbury until 1859 except for a brief interlude during the reign of Henry VIII. Norbury remained rural and agricultural throughout this period. By 1800 most of the land in Norbury was owned by a handful of people; approximately half was owned by the Carew family, and the remaining large landowners were Peter du Cane, Croydon Hospital and Pembroke College.

Victorian period

At the start of the Victorian period, the population consisted of fifty six people and three main dwellings; the Hermitage, Norbury Manor Farm House and Norbury Hall. The Hermitage was situated alongside Green Lane and backed onto Hermitage Sports Ground (now Norbury Park). The last resident of The Hermitage was Jenny Hill, a famous music hall performer in the 1890s. In 1894 the North Surrey Golf Club built a 90-acre golf club on Hermitage Sports Ground and in 1896 purchased The Hermitage to use as their club house. The following year it was destroyed by fire. Norbury Manor Farm House was situated on the corner where Norbury Avenue meets Kensington Avenue and was the Norbury Manor House until Norbury Hall was built in 1802. The Farm House was demolished in 1914. Only Norbury Hall remains, now used as a retirement home and protected as a Grade II listed building.

In 1859, the first Victorian villa, known as Norbury Villa, was built on the London Road.  A second villa followed in 1878, and thereafter followed the construction of clusters of large villas along both sides of the London Road. In 1867, the Committee of Croydon Steeple Chase and Hurdle Races leased approximately 100 acres at Lonesome Farm. The following year, the first Streatham Horse Race meeting was held and a temporary grandstand was built on Northborough Road. The two day meets, held four or five times a year, proved successful and attracted large crowds from London. To cater for the crowds, Norbury railway station opened in 1878, built on a railway line which had run through Norbury since 1862. The increased crowds however led to an increase in anti-social behaviour, and local residents lobbied politicians to enact a new law in 1879 banning horse racing within ten miles of Westminster, effectively ending the Streatham Races.

Urbanisation

By 1900, Norbury was an affluent semi-rural suburb boasting two golf courses and cricket, football, tennis and bowls clubs. The first shopping parades on the London Road were constructed in 1900 and side roads behind the parades began to be laid out. Electric trams were introduced in 1901 connecting the town to Purley, however as Croydon trams and London trams used different systems and could not use the same tracks, when going to London passengers had to change in Norbury. During the next thirty years most of the housing in Norbury was constructed, with the houses and roads in different areas forming part of several residential estates. The most notable estate was the Norbury Cottage Garden Estate built in 1901 in thirty acres of land between Northborough Road and Semley Road, and which was the first cottage estate built by the London County Council. The population of Norbury had risen from 475 people in 1901 to 15,538 by 1931.

During the second half of the twentieth century, many of the large Victorian villas were demolished and office blocks were built on their sites. Later many of the office blocks were themselves converted into residential apartments. In 1970 Norbury Fire Station was built to replace nearby Streatham Fire Station.

Modern Norbury 

Today, Norbury is a built-up residential area housing a diverse and multi-cultural community. It has a variety of local commerce, with most of Norbury High Street consisting of newsagents and various independent businesses, as well as several pubs. It is also very well connected to other areas, such as Crystal Palace, Croydon, Streatham and Central London. Norbury Station is in fare zone 3. Some locals consider the area to be in decline, with increased fly-tipping and anti-social behaviour, and a campaign has been started to reverse these changes.

Demography
In the 2011 census, Norbury was White or White British (37.4%), Asian or Asian British (28%), Black or Black British (24.8%), Mixed/multiple ethnic groups (6.5%), and  Other ethnic group (2.2%). The largest single ethnicity is White British (24.1%).

Of those living in Norbury, the most common place of birth is England (55%), followed by India (5%), Pakistan (4%), Jamaica (4%) and Kenya (2%). The main first language spoken is English (76.5%), followed by Polish (4%), Urdu (3.3%) and Gujarati (2.8%).

The largest religious groupings are Christians (52 per cent), then Muslims (17.8 per cent), those of no religion (12.6 per cent), Hindus (7.6 per cent), no response (7.6 per cent), Sikhs (0.9 per cent), other (0.8 per cent), Buddhists (0.5 per cent) and Jews (0.1 per cent).

Politics
Norbury is part of the Croydon North constituency and the current MP is the Labour politician Steve Reed. The constituency replaced the Croydon North East constituency in 1997 and has returned Labour Party MPs since it was re-instated.

Norbury includes two of the twenty-eight wards which make up Croydon London Borough Council. These two wards, both created in 2018, are Norbury and Pollards Hill and Norbury Park.

Norbury and Pollards Hill

Norbury Park

Nearest places
 Brixton
 Streatham
 Streatham Common
 West Norwood
 Crystal Palace / Upper Norwood
 Mitcham
 Pollards Hill
 Thornton Heath
 Croydon

Notable people and residents 
 Kingsley Amis (1922–1995), novelist
 Correlli Barnett (1927–2022), military historian
 Derek Bentley (1933–53), a burglar who was controversially hanged for the death of a police officer in 1952 (subject of the film Let Him Have It).
 Edwy Searles Brooks (1889–1965), novelist
 Samuel Coleridge-Taylor (1875–1912), composer
 John Creasey (1908–1973), detective-story writer
 Dave (1998–), rapper
 Janet Francis (1947–), actress
 Deryck Guyler (1914–1999), actor
 Wee Willie Harris (1933–), singer
 Will Hay (1888–1949), comedian and actor
 Libera, boys' choir
 Michael Moorcock (1939–), writer and musician
 Osh (1995–), singer
 Robert Prizeman (1952–2021), composer
 Ralph Reader (1903–1982), actor
 Stormzy (1993–), rapper
 Roxanne Tataei (1988–), singer

Nearest railway stations
Norbury railway station
Mitcham Eastfields railway station
Streatham Common railway station
Streatham railway station
Mitcham Junction railway station
Thornton Heath railway station

In fiction
Norbury is portrayed in a Sherlock Holmes short story, "The Adventure of the Yellow Face", as one of the few places in which the detective turned out to be wrong regarding his theories (as referenced in the episode "The Six Thatchers" of the BBC television series Sherlock).

Norbury is mentioned in Penelope Fitzgerald's The Beginning of Spring (1988). The character of Nellie Reid, who is central to the plot, but who does not appear until the book's final sentence, is from Norbury; and it is repeatedly mentioned throughout the book in contrast to a very different type of life in Moscow.

Norbury station features in the song "Lesley", from rapper Dave's debut album Psychodrama (2019).

References

Districts of the London Borough of Croydon
Districts of the London Borough of Lambeth
Districts of the London Borough of Merton
Areas of London
District centres of London